Viivi Puskala (born 16 January 1999) is a Finnish racing cyclist. She rode in the women's road race event at the 2018 UCI Road World Championships.

References

1999 births
Living people
Finnish female cyclists
Place of birth missing (living people)